Arabcheh (also Romanized as ‘Arabcheh; also known as ‘Arabchāh, Arabchakh, ‘Arafsheh, and ‘Aruqsheh) is a village in Zanjanrud-e Pain Rural District, Zanjanrud District, Zanjan County, Zanjan Province, Iran. At the 2006 census, its population was 59, in 13 families.

References 

Populated places in Zanjan County